Matija Šestak (born 30 December 1972 in Ljubljana) is a retired Slovenian sprinter who specialised in the 400 metres. He represented his country at the 2000 and 2004 Summer Olympics reaching the semifinals at the second occasion. He also reached the semifinals at the 1999 World Championships.

He is married to a Serbian triple jumper, Marija Šestak, who switched her nationality to Slovenian after marriage.

Competition record

Personal best
Outdoor
200 metres – 20.79 (+2.0 m/s) (Nova Gorica 2004)
300 metres – 32.34 (Ljubljana 2004) NR
400 metres – 45.43 (Seville 1999) NR
Indoor
200 metres – 21.32 (Turin 1999)
400 metres – 46.71 (Stuttgart 2000) NR

References

1972 births
Living people
Slovenian male sprinters
Athletes (track and field) at the 2000 Summer Olympics
Athletes (track and field) at the 2004 Summer Olympics
Olympic athletes of Slovenia
Sportspeople from Ljubljana
Athletes (track and field) at the 1997 Mediterranean Games
Mediterranean Games competitors for Slovenia
Slovenian athletics coaches